The South Dublin Panthers are an American Football team, formed in 2014 from the former Dublin Dragons, in turn established in 2001.  They compete in the American Football Ireland, Premier Division, the top tier of American Football in Ireland.

The team is based in Tymon Park in Dublin and is one of the largest American Football organizations in Ireland. The Panthers field teams in all competitions: youth football, adult football and the non-contact version, flag football. They play their home matches at the Kings Hospital, Palmerstown.

History 
The South Dublin Panthers came into being as the Dublin Dragons in 2001 and, following the close of the 2014 season, were rebranded and reconstituted by the members. Coach John Romanoski remained as Head Coach after guiding the Dragons to promotion to the Shamrock Bowl Conference in 2014. 

.

2015 
The Panthers began their inaugural season in the SBC North, finishing the season in 4th place in the division ahead of the Belfast Knights.

Shamrock Bowl Conference North Division

Results

2016 
The Panthers struggled to build on some of the promise shown in their opening season. With a reduced squad, they failed to register a win in 2016; they again finished 4th in the SBC North Division by virtue of the Craigavon Cowboys being deducted points and relegated. The close of the 2016 season saw the departure of John Romanoski as head coach, along with most of the coaching staff. The offensive coordinator, Stephen McDonnell, was promoted to the position of head coach.

Shamrock Bowl Conference North Division

Results

2017 
The Panthers opened 2017 with their new head coach and an increased squad size.

Results

Shamrock Bowl Conference North Division

2018 
The Panthers moved into the Shamrock Bowl Conference South Division for the 2018 season and reached the playoffs for the first time. The season ended after double overtime loss to the Cork Admirals in the playoffs. One of the most tense and dramatic games of the year saw the Panthers recover a 17-point deficit in the second half, levelling the game with a field goal as the clock hit zero.

Results

Shamrock Bowl Conference South Division

Shamrock Bowl Playoffs 2018 Wild Card Round

2019 
The Panthers competed in the new restructured Shamrock Bowl Conference vying to improve on their 2018 performance and playoff position. 2019 was a record setting year, with the Panthers eclipsing their best ever offensive points scored (160), points allowed (138), rushing touchdowns (10) and passing touchdowns (11). It was also the first ever time the Panthers had qualified for the SBC Semi-Final as part of the 4 best teams in the country.

The Panthers first ever youth team made it to the playoffs in their inaugural season.

Adult Team

Regular season

Shamrock Bowl Conference

Playoffs

Semi-final 

The Panthers beat the previously unbeaten Cork Admirals in the SBC Semi Finals. It was a comprehensive victory with two scores on the ground courtesy of running back Ben Arulogun and one through the air as QB Ian Cahill found Eoin Neville in the back corner of the endzone. The Admirals were heavily favoured, and the Panthers upset win advanced them to their first appearance in the Shamrock Bowl.

Shamrock Bowl

Academy Team 
2019 was the first season of the South Dublin Panthers Academy Program.

Regular season

Playoffs

2020 
The 2020 season was canceled due to the COVID-19 outbreak.

2021

Adult 
There was no competitive adult football in 2021 due to the COVID-19 outbreak.

Academy

Regular season

Playoffs

Coaching staff

Awards

Most Valuable Player - Adult 

No MVP was awarded in 2020 or 2021 as both seasons were cancelled due to the Covid-19 pandemic.

Most Valuable Player - Academy

Official Sponsors 
The South Dublin Panthers are sponsored by Roar Beverages and by The Camden Bar, Dublin.

References 
2 . Irish Athletes, Olawale Gazal And Kevin Mayo Have Both Received Scholarships To Study & Play American Football In North Park University Of Chicago

External links 
 South Dublin Panthers official website
 American Football Ireland Official Website
 South Dublin Panthers on Facebook
South Dublin Panthers on Instagram

Sport in Belfast
American football teams in the Republic of Ireland
2014 establishments in Ireland
American football teams established in 2014